This List of truck types is intended to classify trucks and to provide links to articles on the various types. The three main classifications for road truck by weight are light trucks, medium trucks, and heavy trucks. Above this there are specialised very heavy trucks and transporters such as heavy haulers for moving oversized loads, and off-road heavy haul trucks used in and mining which are too large for highway use without escorts and special permits.

Small trucks
Mini trucks, small Commercial vehicles used for delivering light loads over short distances.

Light trucks

Light trucks are larger than mini trucks but smaller than medium trucks. There is no smaller classification.

Minivan
Sport utility vehicle
Pickup truck/Ute
Panel truck
Canopy express
Panel van
Tow truck (may also be a medium or heavy truck)

Medium trucks

Medium trucks are larger than light but smaller than heavy trucks. In North America, a medium-duty truck is larger than a heavy-duty pickup truck or full-size van. Some trucks listed as medium also are made in heavy versions.

Box truck
Van
Cutaway van chassis
Medium Duty Truck such as Ford F-650 in North America
Medium Standard Truck
Platform truck
Flatbed truck (may also be light-duty trucks)
Stake bed truck (may also be light-duty trucks)
Firetruck (may also be a heavy truck)
Recreational Vehicle or Motorhome

The following are not types of trucks but types of use of the trucks listed above:
Delivery truck, Multi-Stop truck, Bottler.

Heavy trucks

Heavy trucks are heavier than medium trucks. There is no higher on-road classification.

Many heavy trucks listed are also made in medium duty versions:
Concrete transport truck (cement mixer)
Mobile crane
Dump truck
Garbage truck
Log carrier
Refrigerator truck
Tractor unit
Tank truck

Very heavy trucks and transporters

Vehicles in this category are too large for highway use without escorts and special permits.

Haul truck, an exceptionally large off-road dump truck, common in mining operations
Ballast tractor, a very heavy weight power source for towing and pulling exceptional loads
Heavy hauler, a combination of power source and very heavy weight transporter
ALMA transporter is used for transportation of ALMA transporter antennae.

See also
Commercial vehicle
Construction equipment
List of land vehicles types by number of wheels
Tautliner
Truck classification

References

Truck types
Types